Olenecamptus fukutomii is a species of beetle in the family Cerambycidae. It was described by Hasegawa in 2004. It is known from the Bonin Islands in Japan.

References

Dorcaschematini
Beetles described in 2004